Franchise  may refer to:

Business and law
 Franchising, a business method that involves licensing of trademarks and methods of doing business to franchisees
 Franchise, a privilege to operate a type of business such as a cable television provider, public utility, or taxicab company, sometimes requiring the filing of tariff schedules, as in:
 Television franchise, a right to operate a television network
 Cable franchise, a right to operate a cable television network
 Cable television franchise fee, an annual fee charged by a local government to a private cable television company 
 Passenger rail franchising in Great Britain, a system of contracting out the operation of the passenger services on the railways of Great Britain
 Franchise, a clause used by insurance companies as a threshold for policy payments, as in deductible
 Franchise, political franchise, or suffrage, the civil right to vote
 Franchise jurisdiction, in English history, a jurisdiction held as private property
 Franchise Pictures, a film production company

Arts, entertainment, and media
 Media franchise, a collection of related creative works, such as films, video games, books, etc., particularly in North American usage
 "Franchise" (short story), a 1955 short story by Isaac Asimov
 Dem Franchize Boyz, an American hip hop group from Atlanta
 Franchise Times, a business magazine for franchises in the United States
 "Franchise" (song), a 2020 song by Travis Scott

Sports
 Franchise, a term for a team in the type of professional sports league organization most commonly found in North America; see North American professional sports league organization
Franchise player, a player on such a team around whom an entire competitive squad can be built
 Franchise tag, a designation of a player in the US National Football League whose contract is soon to expire that binds them to the team for one year at an enhanced salary
 Sports league franchise, or League franchise, a local or regional business franchising operation under a particular sporting league in activities such as pool, darts, etc.

See also
 The Franchise (disambiguation)
 
 

cy:Etholfraint